A city is the highest form of all incorporated urban municipality statuses used in the Canadian Province of Alberta. Alberta cities are created when communities with populations of at least 10,000 people, where a majority of their buildings are on parcels of land smaller than 1,850 m², apply to Alberta Municipal Affairs for city status under the authority of the Municipal Government Act. Applications for city status are approved via orders in council made by the lieutenant governor in Council under recommendation from the Minister of Municipal Affairs.

Alberta's largest and smallest cities are Calgary and Wetaskiwin, with populations of 1,306,784 and 12,594, respectively.

Beaumont became Alberta's 19th city on January 1, 2019.

157 elected city officials (19 mayors and 138 councillors) provide city governance throughout the province.

The highest density of cities in Alberta is found in the Edmonton Metropolitan Region (Beaumont, Edmonton, Fort Saskatchewan, Leduc, Spruce Grove and St. Albert). The Calgary Metropolitan Region has three cities (Airdrie, Calgary and Chestermere).

Administration 
Pursuant to Part 5, Division 1 of the Municipal Government Act (MGA), each municipality created under the authority of the MGA is governed by an elected council. As a requirement of the MGA, a city council consists of an odd number of councillors, one of which is the city's chief elected official (CEO) or mayor. A city council consists of seven councillors by default, but it can consist of a higher or lower odd number if council passes a bylaw altering its size (so long as it does not consist of fewer than three councillors).

City councils are governed by a mayor who is elected at large and an even number of councillors, resulting in a total odd number of councillors to avoid tie votes on council matters. For the councillors, a city council may establish ward systems, with councillors elected from wards that are defined as having roughly the same population (single-member districts or more than one member per district). Voters choose a councillor candidate running in the ward in which they live. If no ward system is in place, councillors are elected at-large like the mayor.

All city councillors are elected by popular vote under the provisions of the Local Authorities Election Act (LAEA). Mayoral or councillor candidates are required to be residents of their municipality for a minimum of six consecutive months prior to nomination day. The last municipal election for all cities, with the exception of the border city of Lloydminster, was held October 18, 2021. Lloydminster's elections are aligned with Saskatchewan's municipal election schedule.

Alberta Municipal Affairs, a ministry of the Cabinet of Alberta, is charged with coordination of all levels of local government.

Administrative duties of cities include public safety, local transit, roads, water service, drainage and waste collection, as well as coordination of infrastructure with provincial and regional authorities (including road construction, education, and health).

List 
{|class="wikitable sortable" 
!scope="col" rowspan=2|Name 
!scope="col" rowspan=2|Region 
!scope="col" rowspan=2|Incorporationdate (city) 
!scope=“col” rowspan=2|Councilsize 
!scope=“col” colspan=5| 2021 Census of Population
|-
!scope=“col”| Population(2021)
!scope=“col”| Population(2016)
!scope=“col”| Change(%)
!scope=“col”| Landarea(km2)
!scope=“col” data-sort-type=“number”| Populationdensity(per km2)
|-
|scope=“row”| Airdrie || Calgary Metro ||align=center|  ||align=center|  ||  ||align=right|  ||align=right| 
|-
|scope=“row”| Beaumont || Edmonton Metro ||align=center|  ||align=center|  ||  ||align=right|  ||align=right| 
|-
|scope=“row”| Brooks || Southern ||align=center|  ||align=center|  ||  ||align=right|  ||align=right| 
|-
|scope=“row”| Calgary || Calgary Metro ||align=center|  ||align=center|  ||  ||align=right|  ||align=right| 
|-
|scope=“row”| Camrose || Central ||align=center|  ||align=center|  ||  ||align=right|  ||align=right| 
|-
|scope=“row”| Chestermere || Calgary Metro ||align=center|  ||align=center|  ||  ||align=right|  ||align=right| 
|-
|scope=“row”| Cold Lake || Central ||align=center|  ||align=center|  ||  ||align=right|  ||align=right| 
|-
|scope=“row”| Edmonton || Edmonton Metro ||align=center|  ||align=center|  ||  ||align=right|  ||align=right| 
|-
|scope=“row”| Fort Saskatchewan || Edmonton Metro ||align=center|  ||align=center|  ||  ||align=right|  ||align=right| 
|-
|scope=“row”| Grande Prairie || Northern ||align=center|  ||align=center|  ||  ||align=right|  ||align=right| 
|-
|scope=“row”| Lacombe || Central ||align=center|  ||align=center|  ||  ||align=right|  ||align=right| 
|-
|scope=“row”| Leduc || Edmonton Metro ||align=center|  ||align=center|  ||  ||align=right|  ||align=right| 
|-
|scope=“row”| Lethbridge || Southern ||align=center|  ||align=center|  ||  ||align=right|  ||align=right| 
|-
|scope=“row”| Lloydminster (part) || Central ||align=center|  ||align=center|  ||  ||align=right|  ||align=right| 
|-
|scope=“row”| Medicine Hat || Southern ||align=center|  ||align=center|  ||  ||align=right|  ||align=right| 
|-
|scope=“row”| Red Deer || Central ||align=center|  ||align=center|  ||  ||align=right|  ||align=right| 
|-
|scope=“row”| Spruce Grove || Edmonton Metro ||align=center|  ||align=center|  ||  ||align=right|  ||align=right| 
|-
|scope=“row”| St. Albert || Edmonton Metro ||align=center|  ||align=center|  ||  ||align=right|  ||align=right| 
|-
|scope=“row”| Wetaskiwin || Central ||align=center|  ||align=center|  ||  ||align=right|  ||align=right| 
|- class="sortbottom" align="center" style="background: #f2f2f2;"
| Total cities 
|align=center| — 
|align=center| — 
|align=center| 157 
| 
|align=right| 
|align=right| 
|- 
|}
Notes:

Former cities 
Alberta has recognized three other cities in its history. The Town of Strathcona incorporated as a city on March 15, 1907, and subsequently amalgamated with Edmonton on February 1, 1912. Fort McMurray was incorporated as a city on September 1, 1980, but reverted to its current urban service area form as a result of its amalgamation with Improvement District (I.D.) No. 143 on April 1, 1995. The Town of Drumheller was incorporated as a city on April 3, 1930 (well before the current requirement to have a population in excess of 10,000 people), and reverted to town status on January 1, 1998, when it amalgamated with the surrounding Municipal District of Badlands No. 7.

City status eligibility 
There are currently nine towns – Blackfalds, Canmore, Cochrane, High River, Morinville, Okotoks, Stony Plain, Strathmore, and Sylvan Lake – that are eligible for city status having populations in excess of 10,000. In addition, the Town of Hinton has expressed interest in incorporating as a city once it surpasses 10,000 people. Its population in 2021 was 9,817.  

Alberta's two urban service areas – Fort McMurray and Sherwood Park – are also eligible for city status. As noted above, Fort McMurray was previously incorporated as a city until it amalgamated with I.D. No. 143 on April 1, 1995.  Meanwhile, Sherwood Park has remained a hamlet since its first residents arrived in 1955 and, in 1987, 89% of Strathcona County residents voted in favour of maintaining a single municipal government for Sherwood Park and the rural portion of the county.

See also 
List of census divisions of Alberta
List of communities in Alberta
List of hamlets in Alberta
List of municipal districts in Alberta
List of municipalities in Alberta
List of population centres in Alberta
List of summer villages in Alberta
List of towns in Alberta
List of villages in Alberta

References

External links 
 Alberta Municipal Affairs
 Alberta Urban Municipalities Association

 
Alberta
Cities